Radiomonitor is a British music company that tracks the worldwide airplay of songs, with the information given to record labels and radio stations. They have established partnerships with several international companies located in Ireland, Australia and South Africa, and compiled several airplay charts in the United Kingdom in contrast to the Official Charts Company's physical sales-based UK Singles Chart.

Background
Radiomonitor tracks the airplay data of songs played on different multimedia platforms in over 97 countries, which is subsequently accessed by record labels and news publications through their official app, e-mail, or a data feed. The company compiles several weekly radio airplay charts such as the UK Airplay Chart and Italy's Airplay Italia. Radiomonitor has established several charts in the United Kingdom for over a decade, including the Radiomonitor Top 100, the annual Radiomonitor Marketshare, and the Radiomonitor end-of-year Top 100. The data included on the Radiomonitor charts contain several disparities to the Official Charts Company, as the former tracks the biggest airplay songs.

On 30 August 2016, Radiomonitor established a partnership with Canadian software company Yangaroo to provide two separate airplay charts for Ireland; Breaking Irish Chart and Current Irish Music Chart. The former was created to find upcoming performers, while the latter provided a platform for experienced Irish talents. It sponsored the Music Week Awards on 9 May 2019, which was held at Battersea Evolution by British music magazine Music Week. The company expanded to Australia in 2017 after opening 16 offices worldwide, where they partnered with Australian music magazine The Music Network on 6 October 2019 to provide assistance for their charts, which would streamline and accurately improve their data. Similarly, Radiomonitor announced the South African Radiomonitor Airplay Chart on 9 October 2019 after branching out to the country in 2015, where it published data from 170 radio stations and 24 television stations.

References

External links 
 

British record charts
Communications and media organisations based in England
Mass media companies of England
Music industry associations
Music organisations based in the United Kingdom